These are the official results of the men's shot put event at the 1987 IAAF World Championships in Rome, Italy. There were a total number of 21 participating athletes, with the final held on 29 August 1987.

Medalists

Schedule
All times are Central European Time (UTC+1)

Abbreviations
All results shown are in metres

Records

Qualification
 Held on Saturday 29 August 1987

Final

See also
 1984 Men's Olympic Shot Put (Los Angeles)
 1986 Men's European Championships Shot Put (Stuttgart)
 1988 Men's Olympic Shot Put (Seoul)
 1990 Men's European Championships Shot Put (Split)
 1992 Men's Olympic Shot Put (Barcelona)

References
 Results

s
Shot put at the World Athletics Championships